Madrasa Al Husseiniya Al Sughra or the Small Husainid Madrasa  is a tunisian madrasah in the Medina of Tunis.

Location 

The madrasa is located in 60 Tourbet El Bey Street, next to the small Mausoleum of the Husainid Dynasty also known as Tourbet El Fellari.

History
It was the first madrasa to be built in the Medina of Tunis during the Husainid era few years after Al-Husayn I ibn Ali's accession to the throne.
The construction work started in 1708 and finished 2 years later.

Students
The madrasa used to host 10 Malikite students coming from interior regions of the country. Each one of them had its own room.
But by the 20th century, the number of students increased and reached 21.
It had its own Imam and a cheikh to teach the students.

References 

Madrasas in the medina of Tunis